Senecio  is a genus of flowering plants in the daisy family (Asteraceae) that includes ragworts and groundsels.

Variously circumscribed taxonomically, the genus Senecio is one of the largest genera of flowering plants.

Description

Morphology
The flower heads are normally rayed with the heads borne in branched clusters, and usually completely yellow, but green, purple, white and blue flowers are known as well.

In its current circumscription, the genus contains species that are annual or perennial herbs, shrubs, small trees, aquatics or climbers. The only species which are trees are the species formerly belonging to Robinsonia occurring on the Juan Fernández Islands.

Chemistry
Pyrrolizidine alkaloids are found in all Senecio species. These alkaloids serve as a natural biocides to deter or even kill animals that would eat them. Livestock generally do not find them palatable. Senecio species are used as food plants by the larvae of some Lepidoptera species that have developed tolerance for these alkaloids.

Taxonomy
The traditional circumscription of Senecio is artificial, being polyphyletic, even in its new circumscription which is based on genetic data. Despite the separation of many species into other genera, the genus still contains  species and is one of the largest genera of flowering plants. 

As no morphological synapomorphies are known to determine which species belong to the genus or not, no exact species number is known. The genus has an almost worldwide distribution and evolved in the mid- to late Miocene.

Phylogeny
Many genera and the whole tribe are in need of revision. Many species currently placed in the genus need to be transferred to other or new genera, and others have been retransferred to Senecio. In its new delimitation the genus is still not monophyletic.

Genera that have been included are the following:
 Aetheolaena
 Culcitum
 Hasteola
 Iocenes B. Nord.
 Lasiocephalus Willd. ex Schltdl.
 Robinsonia

Synonyms

The following genera contain species that are or have been included within Senecio.
 Antillanthus B. Nord.
 Barkleyanthus H. Rob. & Brettell
 Brachyglottis J. R. Forst. & G. Forst.
 Canariothamnus B. Nord.
 Curio P.V. Heath
 Dauresia B. Nord. & Pelser
 Dendrophorbium C. Jeffrey
 Dendrosenecio (Hauman ex Hedberg) B. Nord. - Giant groundsels occurring in the high altitude areas of East Africa
 Dorobaea Cass.
 Dresslerothamnus H. Rob.
 Elekmania B. Nord.
 Herreranthus B. Nord.
 Hubertia Bory
 Jacobaea Mill.Leonis B. Nord.
 Ligularia 
 Lundinia B. Nord.
 Mesogramma DC.
 Monticalia C. Jeffrey
 Nelsonianthus H. Rob. & Brettell
 Nesampelos B. Nord., nom. inval.
 Oldfeltia B. Nord. & Lundin
 Packera Á. Löve & D. Löve
 Pentacalia Cass.
 Pippenalia McVaugh
 Pittocaulon H. Rob. & Brettell
 Pojarkovia Askerova
 Psacaliopsis H. Rob. & Brettell
 Pseudogynoxys (Greenm.) Cabrera
 Pseudojacobaea (Hook. f.) R. Mathur
 Roldana La Llave
 Sinosenecio B. Nord.
 Synotis (C. B. Clarke) C. Jeffrey & Y. L. Chen
 Telanthophora H. Rob. & Brettell
 Tephroseris (Rchb.) Rchb.
 Vendredia Baill.
 Zemisia B. Nord.

Etymology
The scientific name, Senecio, means "old man".

Selected species

Senecio ampullaceus — Texas ragwort, Texas squaw-weed, Texas groundsel, clasping-leaf groundsel
Senecio angulatus L.f. — creeping groundsel
Senecio antisanae
Senecio arborescens’Senecio barbertonicus Klatt — succulent bush senecio
Senecio battiscombei
Dendrosenecio battiscombei
Senecio bigelovii — nodding groundsel
Senecio bosniacus G. Beck — Bosnian ragwort
Senecio brasiliensis (Spreng.) Less. — flor-das-almas
Cineraria brasiliensis
Senecio candicans — angel wings
Senecio cambrensis — Welsh groundsel, Welsh ragwort
Senecio congestus (R. Br.) DC. — marsh ragwort, clustered marsh ragwort, marsh fleabane
Cineraria palustris
Othonna palustris
Tephroseris palustris
Senecio crassissimus
Senecio douglasii — threadleaf groundsel
Senecio elegans — purple groundsel
Senecio flaccidus Less. — Douglas senecio, threadleaf groundsel, threadleaf ragwort
Senecio ficoides 
Curio ficoides
Senecio gallicus Chaix — French groundsel
Senecio glabellus Poir. — butterweed
Packera glabella (Poir) C. Jeffrey
Senecio glaucus L. — Jaffa groundsel
Senecio 'Hippogriff' — dolphin necklace, flying dolphins, dolphin plant
Curio × peregrinus
Senecio howeanus 
Senecio inaequidens — South African ragwort
Senecio iscoensis — Hieron.
Senecio jacobaea — is a synonym of Jacobaea vulgaris.
Senecio keniensis
Dendrosenecio keniensis
Senecio keniodendron — giant groundsel
Dendrosenecio keniodendron
Senecio keniophytum
Senecio kleinia
Kleinia neriifolia
Senecio kleiniiformis — spearhead
Senecio lamarckianus
Senecio leucanthemifolius Poir. — coastal ragwort
Senecio littoralis
Senecio madagascariensis — Madagascar ragwort
Senecio macroglossus — Natal ivy, wax ivy
Senecio mikanioides — Cape ivy, German ivy
Delairea odorata
Senecio neowbsteri Olympic Mountain groundsel
Senecio nivalis Kunth
Senecio obovatus Muhl. — roundleaf ragwort
Packera obovata (Muhl. ex Willd.)
Senecio patagonicus
Senecio pauciradiatus
Senecio pulcher
Senecio radicans — string of bananas
Curio radicans
Senecio rowleyanus — string of pearls
Curio rowleyanus
Senecio sanmarcosensis
Senecio scandens — German ivy
Senecio serpens — blue chalksticks
Curio repens
Senecio squalidus — Oxford ragwort
Senecio trapezuntinus 
Senecio triangularis — arrowleaf groundsel
Senecio tropaeolifolius — false nasturtium
Senecio vaginatus
Senecio vernalis — eastern groundsel
Senecio viscosus — sticky ragwort
Senecio vulgaris — common groundsel, old-man-in-the-springFormerly in Senecio '''
 Brachyglottis greyi (as S. greyi)
 Pericallis × hybrida (as S. cruentus)
 Rugelia nudicaulis — Rugels ragwort

Distribution
The genus Senecio'' is distributed almost worldwide. It is one of the few genera occurring in all five regions with a Mediterranean climate. Furthermore, species are found in mountainous regions, including tropical alpine-like areas.

See also
 Ragwort Control Act 2003

References

External links

 

 

 

 
Asteraceae genera
Taxa named by Carl Linnaeus